"Celebration" is the fourth single released by the Belgian duo AnnaGrace, formerly known as Ian Van Dahl. The track is the group's fourth single following their 2008 debut single "You Make Me Feel", 2009 second single "Let the Feelings Go" and 2009 third single "Love Keeps Calling".

Track listing
Digital EP
 "Celebration" (Radio Edit) – 3:20
 "Celebration" (Extended Mix) – 5:30
 "Celebration" (Firebeatz Remix) – 6:32
 "Celebration" (Nash & Pepper vs Erik Lake Remix) – 5:43

Chart performance

References

2010 songs
2010 singles
AnnaGrace songs
Songs written by Annemie Coenen
Songs written by Peter Luts